Democratic Confederation of Labour may mean:

 Democratic Confederation of Labour (DRC)
 Democratic Confederation of Labour (Morocco)